Her Beloved Enemy is a 1917 American silent mystery film directed by Ernest C. Warde and starring Doris Grey, Wayne Arey, and J.H. Gilmour.

Cast
 Doris Grey as Sylvia Leigh 
 Wayne Arey as Enemy of Sylvia's Father 
 J.H. Gilmour as Sylvia's Father 
 Gladys Leslie as Dorothy, Sylvia's Friend 
 Ernest Howard as Undetermined Role 
 Carey L. Hastings as Undetermined Role 
 Anna Buchanan as Undetermined Role

References

Bibliography
 Robert B. Connelly. The Silents: Silent Feature Films, 1910-36, Volume 40, Issue 2. December Press, 1998.

External links
 

1917 films
1917 mystery films
1910s English-language films
American silent feature films
American mystery films
American black-and-white films
Films directed by Ernest C. Warde
Pathé Exchange films
1910s American films
Silent mystery films